Georgiy Georgiyevich Shevel  (9 May 1919 – 16 November 1988) was a Soviet politician and diplomat. He was Minister of Foreign Affairs of the Ukrainian SSR (1970–1980).

Education 
Georgiy Shevel graduated from the Faculty of philology of the University of Kharkiv (1941).

Professional career and experience 
From 1944 to 1946 – he worked in the Komsomol of Ukraine, 2nd Secretary of the Lviv Regional Committee of the Komsomol, 1st Secretary of the Lviv Regional Committee of Komsomol.

From 1946 to 1950 – Secretary of the Central Committee of Komsomol of Ukraine propaganda, 3rd secretary of Komsomol of Ukraine, 2nd secretary of Komsomol of Ukraine.

In 1950–1954 – he was 1st secretary of Komsomol of Ukraine.

In 1954–1960 – He held the post 2nd secretary of the Kyiv City Committee of the Communist Party of Ukraine.

In 1960–1961 – he was secretary of the Kyiv Regional Committee of the Communist Party on agitation and propaganda.

In 1961–1970 – he headed of the Department of propaganda and agitation of the Central Committee of the Communist Party of Ukraine.

From 10 August 1970 to 18 November 1980 – Minister of Foreign Affairs of the Ukrainian SSR. Headed the Ukrainian delegation to sessions of the UN General Assembly.

Diplomatic rank 
 Ambassador Extraordinary and Plenipotentiary

References

External links 
 MEMORANDUM FOR THE RECORD
 Diplomacy in the Former Soviet Republics James P. Nichol Greenwood Publishing Group, 1.01.1995 – 244.
 Soroka D. I. Historical retrospective of Ukraine's cooperation with the United Nations

1919 births
1989 deaths
Politicians from Kharkiv
People from Kharkov Governorate
National University of Kharkiv alumni
Komsomol of Ukraine members
Soviet foreign ministers of Ukraine
Ukrainian diplomats
Politicians of the Ukrainian Soviet Socialist Republic
Communist Party of Ukraine (Soviet Union) politicians
Central Committee of the Communist Party of Ukraine (Soviet Union) members
Tenth convocation members of the Verkhovna Rada of the Ukrainian Soviet Socialist Republic
Ninth convocation members of the Verkhovna Rada of the Ukrainian Soviet Socialist Republic
Eighth convocation members of the Verkhovna Rada of the Ukrainian Soviet Socialist Republic
Seventh convocation members of the Verkhovna Rada of the Ukrainian Soviet Socialist Republic
Sixth convocation members of the Verkhovna Rada of the Ukrainian Soviet Socialist Republic
Fifth convocation members of the Verkhovna Rada of the Ukrainian Soviet Socialist Republic
Fourth convocation members of the Verkhovna Rada of the Ukrainian Soviet Socialist Republic
Third convocation members of the Verkhovna Rada of the Ukrainian Soviet Socialist Republic